Winchell Lake is a lake in Cook County, Minnesota, in the United States. It is most commonly accessed from Brule Lake or Poplar Lake.

Winchell Lake was named for Newton Horace Winchell, a Minnesota geologist.

See also
List of lakes in Minnesota

References

Lakes of Minnesota
Lakes of Cook County, Minnesota